Valaichchenai ( Valaichchenai;  waalasena / Valaichchena) is a town in the Eastern Province of Sri Lanka. It could also be spelled as Valaichenai or Valachchenai. The world-famous Pasikudah Beach is located about 3 km east of Valaichenai along the Indian Ocean. Pasikudah beach is famous for shallow and calm sea water.

Population 
Valaichchenai has  Tamil communities and also Muslims live in Oddamavadi Village. Tamil and Muslim people live east and west of the Valaichenai Main Street, respectively.  There were banana, coconut and paddy plantations which provided the main income along with some fishing. This was changed with the establishment of the paper manufacturing plant.

Transport 
It has a railway station on the Broad gauge system of Sri Lanka Railways.

Schools 
There are several schools in Valaichenai including:
Valaichchenai Hindu College (National School)
 bt/bc an-noor national school
 Peththelai Vipulananda Vidiyalayam
 Aysha Mahalir Maha Vidyalayam
 Vani Vidyalayam
 Karuwakerni Vigneswara Vidyalayam
 Vinayagaapuram Vinayagar Vidyalayam
 Sri Krishna School

See also
 The American Batticaloa Development Fund, provided electricity connection to Sri Krishna School

References 

Towns in Batticaloa District
Koralaipattu DS Division